Xiuyan Road is a station on Line 11 of the Shanghai Metro. It opened on December 19, 2015. This station was formerly known as East Kangqiao Road. Xiuyan Road Station is filled will abundant natural light from the station’s high ceiling sky lights. The station also has amenities, such as a platform waiting room, and three exits to Xiuyan Road.

Line 16 passes nearby, but does not stop here.

The station started construction during the first phase of the Line 11 Disney extension, in May 2013, which was during the same time the Shanghai Disney station started construction (Disney Extension Phase II). During the first few years of major work, the station was referred as East Kangqiao Road. In September 2014, the civil construction was substantially complete with work finishing on connecting the two phases of the Disney extension. It was until November 19, 2015, when this station and Phase 1 opened to the public.

References

Railway stations in Shanghai
Line 11, Shanghai Metro
Shanghai Metro stations in Pudong
Railway stations in China opened in 2015